Camp Nou (meaning new field, often referred to in English as the Nou Camp), officially branded as Spotify Camp Nou for sponsorship reasons, is a football stadium in Barcelona, Spain. It has been the home stadium of FC Barcelona since its completion in 1957. With a current seating capacity of 99,354, it is the largest stadium in Spain and Europe, and the second largest association football stadium in the world.

It has hosted two European Cup/Champions League finals in 1989 and 1999, two European Cup Winners' Cup finals, four Inter-Cities Fairs Cup final games, five UEFA Super Cup games, four Copa del Rey finals, two Copa de la Liga finals, and twenty-one Supercopa de España finals. It also hosted five matches in the 1982 FIFA World Cup (including the opening game), two out of four matches at the 1964 European Nations' Cup, and the football tournament's final at the 1992 Summer Olympics.

On 15 March 2022, it was announced that music streaming service Spotify had reached a deal with FC Barcelona to acquire the naming rights to the stadium in a deal worth $310 million. Following the approval of the sponsorship agreement with Spotify by FC Barcelona's Extraordinary Assembly of Delegate Members on 3 April 2022, the stadium was officially renamed on 1 July 2022 as Spotify Camp Nou. 

In April 2022, it was announced that renovation of the stadium will commence in June 2022 after the season's end.

History

Construction 
The construction of Camp Nou started on 28 March 1954 as Barcelona's previous stadium, Camp de Les Corts, had no room for expansion. Although originally planned to be called the Estadi del FC Barcelona, the more popular name Camp Nou was used. The June 1950 signing of László Kubala, regarded as one of Barcelona's greatest players, provided further impetus to the construction of a larger stadium.

On 14 November 1950, the president Agustí Montal i Galobart obtained the favourable agreement of an assembly of members to acquire land for the construction of a new stadium, located in Hospitalet de Llobregat, which was later exchanged with the Barcelona City Council for other land in the neighbourhood of Les Corts. The stadium is located at the end of Travessera de les Corts, next to the Cementiri and the Maternitat. The commission dedicated to the project recommended another location in February 1951. The official purchase took place two years later.

The appointment of Francesc Miró-Sans as president of FC Barcelona, on 14 November 1953, was to relaunch the project. Invested in February of the following year, Miró-Sans decided in favour of the land acquired in 1950, and the first stone of the stadium was laid on 28 March 1954. A procession of several thousands of people made the journey from the Camp de Les Corts to La Masia de Can Planes, where the ceremony of laying the first stone was held, a solemn ceremony in the presence of Miró-Sans, the head of the Civil Government of Barcelona and the archbishop of Barcelona, Gregorio Modrego.

The project was completed one year later, when the club entrusted the construction to the building company Ingar SA. The work was supposed to last eight months, but the costs were more than four times higher than expected, reaching 288 million pesetas. Through mortgages and loans, the club managed to finish the project, borrowing heavily for several years. The club hoped to cover the cost with the sale of the land at Les Corts, but the Barcelona City Council took five years to requalify it, giving rise to a period of certain economic hardship, Finally, the head of state and of the Spanish government at the time, the dictator Francisco Franco, authorised the requalification of the land at Les Corts and put an end to the crisis of the Barcelona club. During the course of the Camp Nou construction work, La Masia served as a workshop for making the models and a workplace for architects and builders.

The architects were Francesc Mitjans and Josep Soteras, with the collaboration of Lorenzo García-Barbón.

Finally, on 24 September 1957, the feast of La Mercè, the Camp Nou was inaugurated. A solemn mass presided over by the archbishop, who welcomed the finished stadium, preceded the Hallelujah from Handel's Messiah. Dignitaries of the Franco regime and of the city gathered in the presidential tribune, and some 90,000 people attended the opening ceremony in the stands of the huge stadium. During the event, football clubs from all over Catalonia paraded on the field, as well as members of the different sections of Barça, the penyes and the different FC Barcelona teams.

Early years and the 1982 World Cup 
In May 1972, Camp Nou hosted its first European Cup Winners' Cup final between Rangers and Dynamo Moscow. Rangers won the match with a score of 3–2.  Electronic scoreboards were installed 1975 in the stadium.

The stadium underwent an expansion in 1980, in anticipation of the 1982 FIFA World Cup, which added boxes, VIP lounges, a new press area, new markers and the construction of the third tier, which was smaller in height than the original design by 6 metres (46.60 metres compared to the original design of 52.50 metres). The expansion of the stadium added 22,150 new seats, taking the total seating capacity to 71,731, and the standing capacity was expanded by 16,500 to 49,670, taking the total stadium capacity (seated and standing combined) to 121,401. FC Barcelona's record attendance was set on 5 March 1986 in the European Cup quarter-final against Juventus in front of 120,000 spectators, just 1,401 shy of the stadium's capacity.

Camp Nou was one of several stadiums used throughout the 1982 World Cup, hosting the inauguration ceremony on 13 June. It also hosted more matches in that tournament than any of the 16 other stadiums used all over Spain, including the opening match, where the traditional opening ceremonies took place (including the releasing of a dove). In front of 95,000, Belgium upset the defending champions Argentina 1–0 in that opening match. It then hosted three round-robin matches between the Soviet Union, Poland, and Belgium, which Poland ended up winning and qualifying from to reach the semi-finals, where they played Italy at the Camp Nou, losing 2–0; Italy went on to win the final match, which was played at Real Madrid's Santiago Bernabéu Stadium in Madrid.

Camp Nou also hosted the 1999 UEFA Champions League Final between Manchester United and Bayern Munich, with both teams in contention to complete league title/domestic cup/European Cup trebles. Bayern led early through Mario Basler's goal in the sixth minute and kept the lead as the clock reached 90 minutes, but United came back to win with injury time goals from Teddy Sheringham and Ole Gunnar Solskjær.

Development 

The stadium's capacity has varied greatly over the years, opening at 106,146, but growing to 121,401 for the 1982 FIFA World Cup.

Apart from hosting Barcelona, Camp Nou is home to the Catalan team. The stadium is frequently used for other football events. The European Cup final between Milan and Steaua București was held on 24 May 1989, with the Italian club winning 4–0. Camp Nou hosted part of the football competition, including the final, in the 1992 Summer Olympics. In preparation for these matches, two additional tiers of seating were installed over the previous roof-line.

Camp Nou underwent little change after 1982, except for the opening of the club museum in 1984. The stadium was renovated in 1993–94, in which the pitch was lowered by 2.5 metres (8 feet), the security gap that separated the lawn from the galleries was removed, and standing room was eliminated in favour of individual seating. A new press box, renovation of the presidential grandstand and boxes, new parking under the main grandstand, and new lighting and sound systems were completed in time for the 1998–99 season. During 1998–99, UEFA rated Camp Nou a five-star stadium for its services and functionalities. Although popularly called Camp Nou, the stadium’s official name was actually “Estadi del FC Barcelona” since its completion, and it was not until the 2000-01 season that club members voted to officially rename the stadium to its popular nickname.

The facilities now included a memorabilia shop, mini-pitches for training matches, and a chapel for the players. The stadium also houses the second-most visited museum in Catalonia, FC Barcelona Museum, which receives more than 1.2 million visitors per year.

On 1 October 2017, Barcelona's league match against Las Palmas was played in an empty Camp Nou due to political turmoil in the region.

Redo and expansion 
The club issued an international tender to remodel the stadium as a celebration of the stadium's fiftieth anniversary. The objective was to make the facility an integrated and highly visible urban environment. The club sought to increase the seating capacity by 13,500, with at least half of the total seating to be under cover. The intention was to make it the third-largest stadium in the world in terms of seating capacity, after the  Narendra Modi Stadium in India (132,000 capacity) and Rungrado 1st of May Stadium in North Korea (114,000 capacity).

On 18 September 2007, the British architect Norman Foster and his company were selected to "restructure" Camp Nou. The plan included the addition of roughly 6,000 seats, for a maximum capacity of 105,000, at an estimated cost of €250 million. The FC Barcelona board approved the sale of their former training ground (the Mini Estadi) against significant opposition in order to finance the remodeling. The project was planned to begin in 2009 and to be finished for the 2011–12 season. However, due to the 2008 financial crisis the sale of the training ground was postponed and likewise the remodeling project. In May 2010, Sandro Rosell, then a candidate for president of FC Barcelona, dismissed the possibility of selling the Mini Estadi, saying it would be indefensible to "sell the crown jewels", and his election on 30 June 2010 effectively halted the plan to remodel Camp Nou.

In January 2014, Barcelona's board of directors rejected the option of building a new stadium due to financial constraints and instead opted to remodel the Camp Nou to bring the capacity up to 105,000. The project was expected to run from 2017 to early 2021, with a cost of around £495 million (€600 million), making it one of the most expensive expansions on a per-seat basis. A refined plan was released in May 2015 showing plans to add a canopy over the stands and showing the plans for seating expansion in greater detail. Construction was planned in 2019 to begin in summer 2020 and to be completed in 2024.

On 28 April 2022, after several delays, the City Council of Barcelona granted a licence for the renovation after the 2021–22 season. The focus of the renovation will be the first and second tier technology aspects. The third tier is scheduled to be demolished in mid-2023 and the renovation is expected to be completed during the 2025–26 season. During the time of the renovation, FC Barcelona will move to Estadi Olímpic Lluís Companys in Montjuïc.

Other uses 

Camp Nou has been used for various purposes other than football, often hosting major concerts. Some notable high-profile appearances  include:
 Pope John Paul II celebrated mass for a congregation of over 121,500 at Camp Nou on 17 November 1982, on the occasion being made an honorary citizen of Barcelona.

 Julio Iglesias appeared in concert here on 5 September 1983 and on 8 September 1988.

 Bruce Springsteen performed here on 3 August 1988 during his Tunnel of Love Express Tour in front of 90,000 fans. He was back on 19 and 20 July 2008 during his Magic Tour. He returned to the stadium on 16 May 2016 during The River Tour. 

 On 9 August 1988, Michael Jackson appeared at the stadium in front of 95,000 fans during his Bad World Tour.

 On 10 September 1988, the Human Rights Now! charity concert organised by Amnesty International to support human rights featured, among others, Bruce Springsteen, Sting, Peter Gabriel, Youssou N'Dour, Tracy Chapman, and El Último de la Fila. 

 A concert by the Three Tenors – Josep Carreras, Plácido Domingo and Luciano Pavarotti – was held on 13 July 1997. 

 U2 performed at the stadium three times: the first one was on 7 August 2005 during their Vertigo Tour, in front of a sold-out crowd of 81,269 people. The second and the third were on 30 June and 2 July 2009 during their U2 360° Tour, in front of a total crowd of 182,055 people. The encore performance of "I'll Go Crazy If I Don't Go Crazy Tonight" from the second 2009 show was filmed for the music video of the single.

On 4 November 2014, Ligue Nationale de Rugby (LNR), which operates France's professional rugby union leagues, announced that the 2015–16 Top 14 final would be held at the Camp Nou on 24 June 2016. The Top 14 final is traditionally held at the Stade de France in the Paris suburb of Saint-Denis. However, the scheduling of the 2015 Rugby World Cup caused the 2015–16 French season to be shifted by several weeks, in turn causing the Stade de France to be unavailable because it would be a major venue for UEFA Euro 2016. The match ultimately drew a crowd of 99,124, setting a new record for attendance at a domestic rugby union match.

On 18 May 2019, the first Super League game was hosted in Spain at Camp Nou as Catalans Dragons defeated Wigan Warriors 33–16. This match set the Super League attendance record for a non-Magic Weekend, regular season fixture, attracting 31,555 fans.

In 2022, Barcelona had the largest known attendances for women's football since the 1971 Women's World Cup final, Mexico–Denmark (110,000), at the Azteca Stadium. Real Madrid and Wolfsburg were the visiting teams at Camp Nou in the Women's Champions League (91,553 and 91,648).

Transport connections 

The stadium is accessible from the Barcelona Metro with the closest stations to Camp Nou are Palau Reial, Maria Cristina and Les Corts, on L3; Badal on L5 and Collblanc on L5 or L9. Usually metro services are increased when there is a match, which causes significant passenger congestion.

A new station, named Avinguda de Xile / Camp Nou, is under construction and will be served by L9 and L10.

Approximately  from Camp Nou there is the Trambaix Avinguda de Xile station (lines T1, T2 and T3).

Camp Nou is also served by several TMB bus routes, an AMB line, and four Nitbus services. Apart from regular routes, there are two special lines to Mossèn Jacint Verdaguer Square and to Catalonia Square on days with matches.

It is connected by L9 from the airport directly to Collblanc, which is a short walk from the stadium.

1982 FIFA World Cup 
The stadium was one of the 17 venues of the 1982 FIFA World Cup, and held the following matches:

References

Bibliography

External links 

 
 Profile at Estadios de España 

FC Barcelona
Football venues in Barcelona
Sports venues completed in 1957
Les Corts (district)
Venues of the 1992 Summer Olympics
Olympic football venues
1964 European Nations' Cup stadiums
1982 FIFA World Cup stadiums
1957 establishments in Spain